Arthur Neal (23 September 1862 – 29 January 1933) was a British politician.

Born in Sheffield, Neal attended Wesley College before becoming a solicitor. He was also the President of Sheffield's Chamber of Commerce.

Political career
Neal was elected to Sheffield City Council as a Liberal in 1903, holding a seat until 1921.

He stood for Parliament in Sheffield Hallam at both the January and December 1910 UK general elections. At the 1918 election, he won the new constituency of Sheffield Hillsborough as a supporter of the Lloyd George Coalition.

In October 1919 he was appointed Parliamentary Private Secretary to the Paymaster-General. In November 1919, he became the Parliamentary Secretary to the Ministry of Transport.

In 1922, Neal lost his seat, and in 1923 and 1924, he instead stood in Bassetlaw, before trying Gainsborough in 1929.

Electoral record

References

Michael Stenton and Stephen Lees, Who's Who of British MPs: Volume III, 1919-1945

External links 
 

1862 births
1933 deaths
Politicians from Sheffield
Liberal Party (UK) MPs for English constituencies
UK MPs 1918–1922
People educated at Wesley College, Sheffield
National Liberal Party (UK, 1922) politicians